Nowhere Boy is a 2009 British biographical drama film, directed by Sam Taylor-Wood in her directorial debut. Written by Matt Greenhalgh, it is based on Julia Baird's biography of her half-brother, the musician John Lennon. Nowhere Boy is about the teenage years of Lennon (Aaron Johnson), his relationships with his aunt Mimi Smith (Kristin Scott Thomas) and his mother Julia Lennon (Anne-Marie Duff), the creation of his first band, the Quarrymen, and its evolution into the Beatles.

Following its premiere at the London Film Festival on 29 October 2009, Nowhere Boy opened in British theatres on 26 December 2009. Nearly a year later, in October 2010, the film received its US release, coinciding with the 70th anniversary of Lennon's birth. Nowhere Boy received positive reviews from critics and was a moderate hit at the box office, earning £4.3 million on a £1.2 million budget.

Plot
The drama tells the story of John Lennon's teenage years from 1955 to 1960. John was separated from his mother, Julia Lennon, when he was five. His aunt and uncle, Mimi and George Smith, raised him like a son. John is close to his Uncle George, who dies suddenly when John is 14. John becomes curious about his mother, who has since had three daughters, one of whom was placed for adoption. He becomes obsessed with rock and roll music during a visit to Blackpool with Julia. When John is suspended from school, Julia allows him to stay at her house during the day to keep Mimi from finding out. Julia teaches John how to play the banjo. Mimi discovers their arrangement, but John refuses to go home with her and stays at Julia's. A week later, John overhears Julia and her common-law husband arguing about him, so he returns to Mimi's.

When John wants to start a rock 'n' roll band, Mimi buys him a guitar. John forms a band named the Quarrymen. At their first gig at a village fête, John meets Paul McCartney. Paul auditions and joins the band. Paul and John soon begin composing songs together. As the Quarrymen gain popularity, John meets Paul's friend, George Harrison, who becomes the band's lead guitarist.

At a birthday party Julia throws for John, he confronts her about his absent father, Alf Lennon. He wants to know why Julia gave him up. He also confronts Mimi, who says Julia cheated on Alf and did not want to stay with him. Alf had asked 5-year-old John to choose whom he wanted to live with. John initially chose his father, though he then wanted to stay with his mother. Without either parent having the time or money to legally determine custody, Mimi became John's custodian. John is upset by this revelation, and leaves in a drunken anger.

John moves out to live on his own. Over time, he, Julia, and Mimi become friendly. When Julia is fatally hit by a car, John is consumed by anger. Two years later, he goes to travel to Hamburg with his newly formed band, the Beatles. Mimi asks John to call her as soon as he arrives. The film ends with the caption, "John phoned Mimi as soon as he arrived in Hamburg...and every week thereafter for the rest of his life."

Cast

 Aaron Johnson as John Lennon
 Kristin Scott Thomas as Mimi Smith
 Anne-Marie Duff as Julia Lennon
 Thomas Sangster as Paul McCartney
 Sam Bell as George Harrison
 David Threlfall as George Toogood Smith
 Josh Bolt as Pete Shotton
 Ophelia Lovibond as Maria Kennedy
 James Michael Johnson as Stan Parkes
 Angelica Jopling as Julia Baird
 Jessie Phoenix Jopling as Jacqueline "Jackie" Dykins
 David Morrissey as Bobby Dykins
 Andrew Buchan as Michael Fishwick
 James Jack Bentham as Rod Davis
 Jack McElhone as Eric Griffiths
 Sam Wilmott as Colin Hanton
 Christian Bird as Jimmy Tarbuck
 Colin Tierney as Alf Lennon
 Paul Ritter as John's headmaster

Production
The film was the directorial debut of conceptual artist/photographer Sam Taylor-Johnson. The screenplay was written by Matt Greenhalgh, who also wrote the Joy Division film Control. It was shot on location in Liverpool, the last house on the right at the end of Sussex Road in Ickenham, Middlesex and at Ealing Studios in West London. Some of the interior school scenes were filmed at Sacred Heart Catholic College in Crosby.
Following the announcement of the film, initial media accounts indicated that it would be based on the book Imagine This: Growing Up with My Brother John Lennon by Lennon's half sister Julia Baird. However, the credits for the completed film do not reference either the book or Baird, with sole writing credit accorded to screenwriter Matt Greenhalgh.  The director consulted both Paul McCartney and Yoko Ono about the script, with both firmly correcting the depiction of Mimi to be less strict and more loving of John. Before landing on Johnson, Wood wanted singer Miles Kane to play the lead, after seeing him in an interview with bandmate Alex Turner, and being struck by their Beatlesque appearance. Wood went backstage to a Last Shadow Puppets show and brought Kane the script, with him ultimately passing on the role.

The film received a National Lottery funding of £1.2 million from the UK Film Council Premier Fund, with an additional £35,500 from its Development Fund to create the script. The film also received a grant from Film4 (the film division of Channel 4).

Release
The film premiered in the UK on 26 December 2009. Its US release was on 8 October 2010, coinciding with that weekend's celebrations of the 70th anniversary of Lennon's birth.

HanWay Films represented worldwide sales. Distributor Icon Entertainment International took the rights for the United Kingdom and Australia. Mars Distribution acquired the rights for France. The Weinstein Company distributed the film in the United States, Germany and Latin America.

Festival screenings
The film had its world premiere on 29 October 2009 at the closing night of the London Film Festival. The film was screened at the 2010 Sundance Film Festival on 27 January. It screened again at the Maui Film Festival in Wailea, Hawaii, on 18 June 2010, the Traverse City Film Festival in Traverse City, Michigan on 27 July 2010, and at The Fest For Beatles Fans convention in Chicago on 14 August 2010.

Reception

Critical reception
The film has received mostly positive reviews from film critics. Based on 135 reviews, it holds an 80% "Certified Fresh" rating on review aggregation site Rotten Tomatoes. The site's critical consensus of the film is: "Don't expect any musical insights, but this look at John Lennon's early life benefits from its restrained, low-key approach and some fine acting from Aaron Johnson." In The New York Times, reviewer Manohla Dargis concluded, "It's a pleasant-enough creation story to revisit, one weighted down by melodrama and lifted up by some rocking tunes."

In his 2013 book Tune In, Beatles historian Mark Lewisohn criticized the historical accuracy of the scene in which Lennon is forced to choose between Alfred and Julia, writing "John’s 'choice' was not between his mother and father, it was between his mostly absent dad’s friend’s parents—in whose lives he had no place—and home and school back in Liverpool. There was no choice at all."

Awards
Nowhere Boy was nominated for four British Academy Film Awards: Outstanding British Film, Best Supporting Actress (one each for Anne-Marie Duff and Kristin Scott Thomas), and Outstanding Debut by a British director (Sam Taylor-Wood). The film also won the Audience Choice Award for Best Feature at the San Diego Film Festival in 2010.

Soundtrack

The soundtrack features several of the songs played by The Quarrymen at the time depicted in the film. New recordings were made featuring performances by Johnson and the Nowhere Boys. Sangster was able to play the guitar before landing his role, but, as he is right-handed, learned how to play left-handed, à la McCartney. Producers negotiated with Yoko Ono for the rights to use Lennon's song "Mother" in the film, which Yoko gave after having watched a private screening of the movie. In addition to the featured songs, British electronica duo Goldfrapp provide the film's instrumental score. The soundtrack was released digitally on 11 December 2009 and in stores as a two-disc album by Sony Music Entertainment on 29 December 2009.

Disc 1 contains songs featured in the film, and Disc 2 is made up of rock and roll classics that inspired the film and Lennon himself.

Disc 1
 Jerry Lee Lewis – "Wild One"
 Dickie Valentine – "Mr. Sandman"
 Jackie Brenston and His Delta Cats – "Rocket 88"
 Elvis Presley – "Shake, Rattle & Roll"
 Wanda Jackson – "Hard Headed Woman"
 Screamin' Jay Hawkins – "I Put a Spell on You"
 The Nowhere Boys – "Maggie May"
 The Nowhere Boys – "That'll Be the Day"
 Eddie Bond and The Stompers – "Rockin' Daddy"
 Eddie Cochran – "Twenty Flight Rock"
 The Nowhere Boys – "That's Alright Mama"
 The Nowhere Boys – "Movin' and Groovin'"
 The Nowhere Boys – "Raunchy"
 Big Mama Thornton – "Hound Dog"
 Gene Vincent and The Blue Caps – "Be-Bop-A-Lula"
 Aaron Johnson – "Hello Little Girl"
 The Nowhere Boys – "In Spite of All the Danger"
 John Lennon – "Mother"

Disc 2
 Chuck Berry – "Roll Over Beethoven"
 Bill Haley and His Comets – "Rock Around the Clock"
 Little Richard – "Rip It Up"
 Elvis Presley – "Baby, Let's Play House"
 Buddy Holly – "Peggy Sue"
 Buddy Knox – "Party Doll"
 Bobby Fuller Four – "I Fought the Law"
 Vince Taylor and His Playboys – "Brand New Cadillac"
 Dale Hawkins – "Susie Q"
 Shirley & Lee – "Let the Good Times Roll"
 Barrett Strong – "Money (That's What I Want)"
 Fats Domino – "Ain't That a Shame"
 Lloyd Price – "Stagger Lee"
 Frankie Vaughan – "These Dangerous Years"
 The Del-Vikings – "Come Go with Me"

Notes

References

External links
 
 
 
 

2009 biographical drama films
2009 directorial debut films
2009 independent films
2000s musical drama films
Biographical films about musicians
British biographical drama films
British independent films
British musical drama films
Incest in film
Films directed by Sam Taylor-Wood
Film4 Productions films
Films about the Beatles
Films about John Lennon
Films based on biographies
Films set in Liverpool
Films set in the 1940s
Films set in the 1950s
Icon Productions films
2000s English-language films
2000s British films